Georgetown is an unincorporated community or populated place (Class Code U6) located in Pettis County, Missouri, United States.

The community is located on Missouri Route H approximately one mile west of US Route 65 and three miles north of Sedalia.

History
Georgetown was platted in 1833, and named after Georgetown, Kentucky, the native home of a first settler. A post office called Georgetown was established in 1837, and remained in operation until 1921.

References

Unincorporated communities in Pettis County, Missouri
Unincorporated communities in Missouri